Based in Melbourne, Australia, Black Market Music began in 1991 with the aim of bringing international blues and roots music to the Australian public through an import and retail business.

They released their first locally produced album, Sassy Mama, by Melbourne blues outfit The Mojo's (now disbanded) in 1995. They have since released nearly 200 albums by artists including Collard Greens & Gravy, Jimi Hocking, Sweet Baby James and Rob Eyers, Maria Forde, Phil Manning, Brian Fraser, The Detonators, Fiona Boyes, Matt Corcoran, Ash Grunwald, Bob Brozman, Jan Preston and Inka Marka.

Their artists can frequently be heard on ABC and community radio and keep a public profile through the press.

They continue to be recognised on state, national and international levels. Collard Greens and Gravy won an ARIA Award (Australia's equivalent to the US Grammy Award) for ‘Best Blues and Roots Album’ with their second release More Gravy in 2001. Inka Marka's debut album Auki Auki was nominated for an ARIA Award for Best World Music Album in 2000. Their artists have regularly triumphed at the International Blues Challenge (IBC) in Memphis, Tennessee. The IBC is an annual competition held by The Blues Foundation to unearth outstanding independent blues musicians. Jimi Hocking, from Melbourne, won first place in the solo/duo division in February 2005. Collard Greens and Gravy won the ‘Best Self-Produced CD’ competition, also at the 2005 IBC, with their third album Silver Bird. In 2003 Fiona Boyes won first place in the solo/duo division. Andy Cowan came second in the solo/duo division in 2002. Collard Greens and Gravy won second place for the overall competition in 2001.

Ash Grunwald, Jan Preston, John McNamara and Dreamboogie have also recently represented Black Market Music at the IBC. Their success in this renowned competition confirms Australia's place as a serious contender in the international blues scene.

References

 ARIA Awards winners 2001
 International Blues Challenge past winners
 MBAS BPOY Archive

External links
 

Australian record labels
Blues record labels
Record labels based in Melbourne